Joseph Dawson III (born 1970) is a United States district judge of the United States District Court for the District of South Carolina.

Education 

Dawson earned his Bachelor of Arts from The Citadel, and his Juris Doctor from the University of South Carolina School of Law.

Career 

From 2001 to 2020,  Dawson operated his own law practice and focused on general civil litigation and providing strategic advice to small businesses. He also currently served as County Attorney for Charleston County, South Carolina, where he was responsible for managing and overseeing all legal matters for the county and its officials.

Federal judicial service 

On October 1, 2020, President Donald Trump announced his intent to nominate Dawson to the United States District Court for the District of South Carolina seat vacated by Judge Terry L. Wooten, who assumed senior status on February 28, 2019. Dawson was recommended by Senator Tim Scott. On October 23, 2020, his nomination was sent to the Senate. On November 18, 2020, a hearing on his nomination was held before the Senate Judiciary Committee. On December 10, 2020, his nomination was reported out of committee by a 13–9 vote. On December 16, 2020, the full United States Senate invoked cloture on his nomination by a 56–39 vote. His nomination was confirmed later that day by a 56–39 vote. He received  his judicial commission on December 22, 2020.

A judicial reform organization filed a formal complaint against Dawson over his ongoing $216,000 contract with the Charleston County government shortly after his confirmation to the United States District Court for the District of South Carolina. Charleston County amended Dawson’s controversial exit contract, and now the federal judge will not receive any cut of the county’s potential payout from the national opioid pharmaceutical litigation. Dawson also had asked the county to clarify that he won’t be providing any legal services to the county in return for the $216,000 the county paid him, Council Chairman Teddie Pryor said. In 2022, Dawson was reprimanded for signing a contract with Charleston County, where he long served as county attorney prior to his judicial appointment, that guaranteed him $216,000 plus a fee for any opioid litigation settlements it won after he joined the federal bench.

See also 
 List of African-American federal judges
 List of African-American jurists

References

External links 
 

1970 births
Living people
20th-century American lawyers
21st-century American lawyers
21st-century American judges
African-American lawyers
African-American judges
United States Army Judge Advocate General's Corps
Judges of the United States District Court for the District of South Carolina
Lawyers from Columbia, South Carolina
National Guard (United States) officers
South Carolina lawyers
The Citadel, The Military College of South Carolina alumni
United States Army officers
United States district court judges appointed by Donald Trump
University of South Carolina School of Law alumni